Casto may refer to:

People

Given name 
 Casto (footballer) (born 1982), Spanish footballer
 Casto Innocenzio Ansaldi (1710–1780), Italian professor, theologian and archaeologist
 Casto Méndez Núñez (1824–1869), Spanish naval officer
 Casto Nopo, Equatoguinean football manager
 Casto Plasencia (1846–1890), Spanish painter

Surname 
 Frank M. Casto (1875–1965), American orthodontist
 Immanuel Casto (born 1983), Italian songwriter
 Kory Casto (born 1981), American baseball player
 Martha Curnutt Casto (1812–1887), American murderer

Places 
 Casto, Lombardy, Italy